Coosa River Basin Initiative (CRBI) is a 501c3 grassroots environmental organization based in Rome, Georgia with the mission of informing and empowering citizens to protect, preserve and restore North America's most biologically diverse river basin, the Coosa. Since 1992, the staff, board and members have served as advocates for "the wise stewardship of the natural resources of the Upper Coosa River basin, or watershed, which stretches from southeastern Tennessee and north central Georgia to Weiss Dam in Northeast Alabama. This includes the Coosa River, the Etowah and Oostanaula rivers and the tributaries of these waterways as well as the land drained by these streams and the air that surrounds this land area."

A member of the Waterkeeper Alliance, CRBI is also known as the Upper Coosa Riverkeeper. As such, they work to enforce the Clean Water Act, by monitoring pollution and polluters. When pollution problems are identified all necessary means , including legal action, are utilized to correct these problems.

As a member of the Georgia Water Coalition and Alabama Rivers Alliance, CRBI works to influence water resource policy in both Georgia and Alabama so that clean and plentiful water is available now and in the future. The organization works in four program areas: advocacy, education, water monitoring and restoration.

In addition to its Rome office, CRBI has a chapter organization, New Echota Rivers Alliance, which operates from Calhoun, Georgia and keeps watch over the Oostanaula River and its tributaries.

History
After a 1991 meeting in Keith, Georgia with a  consortium of citizens fighting local battles over everything from landfills to chipmills, Rome businessman, Jerry Brown, developed the vision of a regional organization that would fight environmental abuses in the  Coosa River Basin, and CRBI was soon born. Its first success was stopping a landfill planned upstream from Weiss Lake.

CRBI originally operated through the work of dedicated volunteers in a small office in the back of Brown's business. CRBI has grown to become a visible presence in the decision-making processes concerning the region's natural resources.

Today, CRBI occupies a Broad Street office in downtown Rome's business district.

Staff
The organization employs full- and part-time staff who coordinate volunteers and work with a 15-member board of directors and a 6-member advisory board to design and implement advocacy, education, water monitoring, restoration and organizational development programs. More than 800 dues paying members support the organization with their money and volunteer services.

Accomplishments
Since its founding in 1992, CRBI's advocacy, education, restoration and water monitoring programs have helped improve water quality in the Coosa River Basin and have helped citizens better understand water resource issues. The organization's major accomplishments include:

Forcing the U.S. Environmental Protection Agency (EPA) to uphold the Clean Water Act through a lawsuit requiring the EPA to set Total Maximum Daily Loads (TMDLs) on our impaired waterways. TMDLs limit the amount of non-point source pollution allowed to enter polluted waterways.
Won a $500,000 settlement against the developer of a large retail center, helping to protect streams and preserve habitat for endangered fish species.
Stopping a plan to “transfer” metro Atlanta , GA sewage to the Coosa River Basin by working successfully with state legislators forcing metro Atlanta communities to rethink their growth strategies.
Stopping the dumping of indigo dye in the Chattooga River by carpet manufacturers and the improper land application of wastewater sludge in Dalton.
Stopping a hot water discharge on Smith-Cabin Creek in Floyd County by Temple-Inland Paperboard & Packaging.
Defeating water legislation that would have allowed Georgia's water to be bought and sold to the highest bidder.  CRBI worked closely with other environmental groups throughout Georgia in the Georgia Water Coalition to keep Georgia's water as a public resource.

Training hundreds of citizens to monitor rivers and creeks throughout the basin.
Citizens collect data which is compiled by CRBI, the City of Rome, the Georgia Environmental Protection Division, and Alabama Water Watch. Trends in water quality are noted and any unusual findings are researched further to ensure no illegal activities are occurring that affect water quality.

Educating thousands of Coosa River Basin citizens in classrooms, civic meetings, public forums, workshops, print and broadcast media and in a quarterly newsletter, Mainstream.

Staff
JESSE DEMONBRUEN-CHAPMAN, EXECUTIVE DIRECTOR & RIVERKEEPERJesse joined CRBI in December 2016 as Executive Director and Riverkeeper. He previously served two and a half years at Ogeechee Riverkeeper based in Savannah where he worked as the organization's outreach coordinator. Prior to moving to Savannah, he served as a director at the Boys and Girls Club of Northwest Georgia for four years and also served for a short time on the CRBI Board of Directors. He is a 2008 graduate of Berry College where he studied Biology and English. He lives in ROme with his wife Ashley and daughter Lilly.

JOE COOK, ADVOCACY & COMMUNICATION COORDINATORJoe has served CRBI as a board member since 1999, and began full-time work as Executive Director and Riverkeeper in January 2005. In January 2014, he started his position as advocacy and communication coordinator. He is a nature/landscape photographer and writer whose work has been published in numerous national and regional magazines and is featured in five books, Wildflowers of the Appalachian Trail, Wildflowers of the Blue Ridge and Smoky Mountains, River Song-A Journey Down the Chattahoochee and Apalachicola Rivers, Etowah River User's Guide and Chattahoochee River User's Guide. He has studied and reported extensively on water resource issues in Georgia since 1994. He and his daughter and her mother spent 26 days canoeing the 160-mile length of the Etowah River in 2002. In 2007, he was the recipient of a national River Hero award from River Network. He is a 1988 graduate of Berry College where he studied communications and agriculture.

SHIRA KERCE, MEMBERSHIP & EVENTS COORDINATORShira joined CRBI in September 2013 as its part-time membership coordinator, and in January 2014 was given the new, full-time position as Membership & Events Coordinator. A 2009 graduate of Berry College where she studied English, she continued her studies at Kennesaw State University and earned a masters of arts in professional writing in 2013. A life-long resident of Rome, she came to CRBI after serving as a communications professional at Kennesaw State University. She has also taught English at Georgia Northwestern Technical College.

Board of directors
Nina Lovel, President,  webmaster/data management coordinator and resident of Rome, Georgia

Doc Kibler, Vice President, principal at Decision Marketing Consulting, president of Big Cedar Creek Farm, manager at Coosa River Mitigation Resource and resident of Cave Spring, Georgia

Barbara Lamb, Treasurer, retired CPA and resident of Kennesaw, GeorgiaTerrell Shaw, Secretary, educator and resident of Rome, Georgia

Blair Carter, engineer and resident of Rome, Georgia

Chad Johnfroe, director of information systems Stanton Carpet Corp. and resident of Rome, Georgia

Doc Kibler, principal at Decision Marketing Consulting, president of Big Cedar Creek Farm, manager at Coosa River Mitigation Resource and resident of Cave Spring, Georgia

Perry Lamb, senior technical support engineer at Phillips Healthcare and resident of Kennesaw, Georgia 

James Lossick, owner/operator Cedar Creek Park and resident of Dallas, Georgia

Mary Lucchese, retired physician and resident of Rome, Georgia

Katie Owens, field manager for The Nature Conservancy and resident of Rome, Georgia

Devan Rediger, biology laboratory coordinator/instructor at Georgia Highlands College and resident of Cartersville, Georgia

Amos Tuck, Limestone Valley Regional Development Center, project coordinator and resident of Rome, Georgia

David Tucker, retired educator and resident of Rome, Georgia

Board of Advisors
Bill Harbin, radiologist, Rome, Georgia
Jerry Jennings, professor at Berry College and former Floyd County Commissioner, Rome, Georgia

George Pullen, retired college instructor and former Rome City Commissioner, Rome, Georgia

Bill McLemore, certified public accountant, Rome, Georgia

Todd Carroll, attorney, Rome, Georgia

References

External links
CRBI Home Page

Rome, Georgia
Rivers of Alabama
Water organizations in the United States
Environmental organizations based in Georgia (U.S. state)